Chetwynd Aston and Woodcote is a civil parish in the district of Telford and Wrekin, Shropshire, England.  It contains 13 listed buildings that are recorded in the National Heritage List for England.  Of these, one is listed at Grade II*, the middle of the three grades, and the others are at Grade II, the lowest grade.  The parish contains the small village of Chetwynd Aston and is otherwise completely rural.  In the parish is the country house of Woodcote Hall; this, structures associated with it, and the nearby church and churchyard wall are listed.  The other listed buildings are houses, farmhouses, and a gateway.


Key

Buildings

References

Citations

Sources

Lists of buildings and structures in Shropshire